Louise Coldefy (born 16 May 1987 in Paris) is a French actress.

Biography
Coldefy attended primary school in Suresnes, a suburb of Paris. She was enthusiastic about acting from a young age and took part in minor theater performances, among other activities. She studied drama at the Conservatoire national from 1996 until 2003 and subsequently the private drama school Cours Florent. After meeting French talent agent Jean-Baptiste L'Herron, she began doing castings for films and television. Her first small role was in the drama Superstar, directed by Xavier Giannoli. She was a member of the comedy troupe Yes vous aime between 2012 and 2016.

Coldefy landed her first major role in 2015 in Arnaud Viard's production Arnaud fait son deuxième film.

The actress gained some international prominence in the 2019 comedy series Family Business, where she plays the eccentric girlfriend of Olivier.

Filmography

Film

Television

References

External links
 

1987 births
Actresses from Paris
Cours Florent alumni
French National Academy of Dramatic Arts alumni
Living people